The Sunnyside Sun is a daily newspaper published in Sunnyside, Washington, five days a week and has a circulation of 3,745. The paper covers community events, sports and local news. The Sun is the newspaper of record for Sunnyside.

History 
The Sunnyside Sun was founded in 1901 by William Hitchcock, a member of a group of Dunkards who were migrating from South Dakota in search of a site for a Christian Cooperative Colony. They purchased the townsite in 1900 and soon founded the Sun, along with various other institutions. It was a weekly paper. That same year, it was identified as one of four Washington papers that refused to publish advertisements for saloons.

In 1914, Yancey Freeman of the Sun was elected vice president of the Yakima-Benton-Kittitas Press Association, an organization newly formed to obtain uniform advertising rates in the Yakima valley. A. S. Hillyer of the Sun was the first speaker featured at the annual convention of the Washington State Press Association in 1922. Also in 1922, the Sun joined with other Washington newspapers, including the Grandview Herald, Ellensburg Record, Wapato Independent. Toppenish Review, Toppenish Tribune. Kennewick Courier-Reporter, Zillah Mirror, Richland Advocate, and Prosser Record-Bulletin to advocate for the McNary-Smith Reclamation Bill. The newspapers' testimony was entered into the Congressional Record of the 67th Congress.

In his History of the Yakima Valley (1919), William Denison Lyman described the Sun as "one of the strongest weekly papers in the valley." The book identified William Hitchcock as the founder and longtime proprietor, and stated that in 1909 the management changed. Hillyer was the editor and manager as of that date. The newspaper's contents were used as a basis for comparing the relative wealth and population of towns in its part of the Yakima Valley.

Hillyer joined with leaders of other Yakima Valley news organizations in 1948 to develop an educational program for students in the local 4-H Club to learn about the news business. The event was intended to be repeated annually.

As of 1959, the paper had an audited circulation of 1,288.

The Sun absorbed the weekly Sunnyside Times in 1962. The paper was acquired by the Oregon-based Eagle Newspapers in 1984. Eagles bought the competing Daily News as well, and merged the two in 1986, under the title Daily Sun.

Daily publication began with Vol.1 in 1986 and ceased with Vol. 117 in 2018. In 1986, Tom Lanctot publisher of Sunnyside Sun and the Eagles executives merged Daily News into Daily Sun Newspaper. After the sale in 2018 the name became Sunnyside Sun which is still in circulation today.

The newspapers original name Sunnyside Sun was changed to Daily Sun News in 1986. In 2018 the name became Sunnyside Sun again.

Achievements 
 In 2002, the Daily Sun News collaborated with Sunnyside Museum to produce a commemorative book, A Pictorial History of Sunnyside Washington. The book features historic photos of Sunnyside.
 In 2011, a design specialist and photographer of Daily Sun News won seven awards between them from the Washington Better Newspaper Contest hosted by Washington Newspaper Publishers Association.

References 

Newspapers published in Washington (state)
Companies based in Yakima County, Washington
1901 establishments in Washington (state)